In Greek mythology, Talos or Talus (/ˈteɪlɒs/; Ancient Greek: Τάλως Talōs) may refer to the following characters mostly connected with Crete:

 Talos, a son of Cres (son of Idaea and Zeus) and the father of Hephaestus who also fathered Rhadamanthys.
Talus, a son of Oenopion, son of Ariadne. His possible mother was the nymph Helice and his only sister was Merope (Aero). Together with his brothers Euanthes, Melas, Salagus and Athamas, they followed their father when he sailed with a fleet from Crete to Chios.
 Talos, son of Daedalus' sister Perdix. Daedalus seeing that his disciple Talos was more gifted than himself, killed him.
 Talos, a giant brazen warder of Crete.
 Talos, a soldier in the army of Turnus, the man who opposed Aeneas in Italy. He was killed by Aeneas.
 Taleus, the son of Adonis and Erinoma.

Notes

References 

 Apollodorus, The Library with an English Translation by Sir James George Frazer, F.B.A., F.R.S. in 2 Volumes, Cambridge, MA, Harvard University Press; London, William Heinemann Ltd. 1921. . Online version at the Perseus Digital Library. Greek text available from the same website.
Diodorus Siculus, The Library of History translated by Charles Henry Oldfather. Twelve volumes. Loeb Classical Library. Cambridge, Massachusetts: Harvard University Press; London: William Heinemann, Ltd. 1989. Vol. 3. Books 4.59–8. Online version at Bill Thayer's Web Site
 Diodorus Siculus, Bibliotheca Historica. Vol 1-2. Immanel Bekker. Ludwig Dindorf. Friedrich Vogel. in aedibus B. G. Teubneri. Leipzig. 1888–1890. Greek text available at the Perseus Digital Library.
 Parthenius, Love Romances translated by Sir Stephen Gaselee (1882-1943), S. Loeb Classical Library Volume 69. Cambridge, MA. Harvard University Press. 1916.  Online version at the Topos Text Project.
Parthenius, Erotici Scriptores Graeci, Vol. 1. Rudolf Hercher. in aedibus B. G. Teubneri. Leipzig. 1858. Greek text available at the Perseus Digital Library.
Pausanias, Description of Greece with an English Translation by W.H.S. Jones, Litt.D., and H.A. Ormerod, M.A., in 4 Volumes. Cambridge, MA, Harvard University Press; London, William Heinemann Ltd. 1918. . Online version at the Perseus Digital Library
 Pausanias, Graeciae Descriptio. 3 vols. Leipzig, Teubner. 1903.  Greek text available at the Perseus Digital Library.
 Publius Vergilius Maro, Aeneid. Theodore C. Williams. trans. Boston. Houghton Mifflin Co. 1910. Online version at the Perseus Digital Library.
 Publius Vergilius Maro, Bucolics, Aeneid, and Georgics. J. B. Greenough. Boston. Ginn & Co. 1900. Latin text available at the Perseus Digital Library.

Ancient Chians
Characters in the Aeneid
Cretan characters in Greek mythology